Head of tide, tidal limit or tidehead  is the farthest point upstream where a river is affected by tidal fluctuations, or where the fluctuations are less than a certain amount. This applies to rivers which flow into tidal bodies such as oceans, bays and deltas.

Though this point may vary due to storms, spring tides, and seasonal or annual differences in water flows, there is generally an average point that is accepted as the head of tide (in Great Britain this is the Normal Tidal Limit, typically noted on Ordnance Survey maps as 'NTL'). A river's tidal data are recorded at various locations downstream of this point. A river's head of tide may be considered the upper boundary of its estuary.

The head of tide is important in surveying, navigation, and fisheries management, and thus many jurisdictions establish a legal head of tide. As the head of tide is useful for navigation, separate maps can be made of the tidal zones up to the head of tide, such as was done in New Jersey.

The head of tide may be many miles upstream from the river's mouth. On the Saint Lawrence River, tides affect the river up to Lake St. Pierre.

See also
 Tidal bore
 Tidal river
Tidewater (region)
 The Tideway
 Mean high water

References

Tides
Estuaries